Janusz Jan Sidło (19 June 1933 – 2 August 1993) was a Polish javelin thrower. He competed at the 1952, 1956, 1960, 1964, and 1968 Olympics and finished in 18th, 2nd, 8th, 4th and 7th place, respectively. He was awarded the Officer's Cross of the Order of Polonia Restituta and later the Knight's Cross. During his long career Sidło won 14 national titles and competed in five European Championships (1954, 1958, 1962, 1966, and 1969), winning them in 1954 and 1958 and medalling in 1969.

In 1954 and 1955, he was chosen the Polish Sportspersonality of the Year.

In October 1953, Sidło set a new European javelin record at 80.15 m in Jena. In June 1956, he set a world record at the 83.66 m in Milan. He went to the 1956 Summer Olympics as a favourite, and was equipped with a modern javelin made of steel, while most of his competitors still used wooden ones. Sidło led the competition with a throw of 79.98 m, but then lent his javelin to his poorly performing friend, Egil Danielsen from Norway. Danielsen set a new world record at 85.71 m and won the gold medal.

International competitions

References

1933 births
1993 deaths
Polish male javelin throwers
Athletes (track and field) at the 1952 Summer Olympics
Athletes (track and field) at the 1956 Summer Olympics
Athletes (track and field) at the 1960 Summer Olympics
Athletes (track and field) at the 1964 Summer Olympics
Athletes (track and field) at the 1968 Summer Olympics
Olympic athletes of Poland
Olympic silver medalists for Poland
Sportspeople from Katowice
Knights of the Order of Polonia Restituta
European Athletics Championships medalists
Medalists at the 1956 Summer Olympics
Olympic silver medalists in athletics (track and field)
Universiade medalists in athletics (track and field)
Universiade silver medalists for Poland
Medalists at the 1961 Summer Universiade